Simon Brauer (born June 22, 1973, in Quito, Ecuador) is a photographer and cinematographer. He is also the author of the first Ecuadorian book on 3D photography, Quito Profundo. He contributed to several advertising agencies, magazines, films and books. His career as a cinematographer and photographer veers towards the artistic, where experimentation is fundamental tool. Brauer was among the first to fight for film studies in Ecuador when local films were rare. In 2014 he was presented in Variety as one of Ecuador's most interesting talents (together with the director Diego Araujo and the actor Victor Aráuz) As a cinematographer he has collaborated with renowned Ecuadorian filmmakers such as Sebastián Cordero, Mateo Herrera, Ivan Mora Manazano and Ana Cristina Barragán. Brauer also work as director of photography of music videos for several well known musicians.

Brauer throughout his career has achieved several awards. From 2007 to date he has been awarded with seven honorable mentions in the "International Photography Awards" one of the most important photography competitions worldwide. His work has been exhibited in several prestigious museums and galleries such as the Museum of the Portuguese Communications Foundation in Lisbon, La Fabrica in Madrid, in the Municipal Museum of Art in Puerto Llano – Spain, among others.

His publication "Quito Profundo" is the first Ecuadorian book of photography in 3D, so it was constituted as an important reference for the history of photography in Ecuador. The "Quito Profundo" photographs are displayed in a colonial museums such as the Church of the Society of Jesus in Quito Ecuador.

References

External links

Talent, Execs Making Waves in Ecuador’s Burgeoning Film Biz

Ecuadorian photographers
Living people
1973 births
People from Quito